The 1974 United States Senate election in Kentucky took place on November 5, 1974. Incumbent Republican U.S. Senator Marlow Cook ran for a second term in office but was defeated by Democratic Governor of Kentucky Wendell Ford.

Republican primary

Candidates
 Marlow Cook, incumbent Senator
 Thurman Jerome Hamlin
 Tommy Klein

Results

Democratic primary

Candidates
 Harvey E. Brazin
 Wendell Ford, Governor of Kentucky

Results

General election

Results

See also 
 1974 United States Senate elections

References

1974
Kentucky
United States Senate